Conizonia guerinii is a species of beetle in the family Cerambycidae. It was described by Breme in 1840, originally under the genus Saperda. It is known from Tunisia and Algeria.

Varietas
 Conizonia guerini var. luteopubens Pic, 1918
 Conizonia guerinii var. glauca (Erichson, 1841)
 Conizonia guerinii var. lineata Pic, 1918

References

Saperdini
Beetles described in 1840